Pablo Lachat (born 20 October 2000) is a Swiss curler from Bussigny, Switzerland. He currently plays lead on Team Yannick Schwaller.

Career
Lachat won the Swiss Junior Curling Championships in 2020 with his team of Jan Klossner, Theo Short and Anthony Petoud. This qualified the team for the 2021 World Junior Curling Championships, however, the event was cancelled due to the COVID-19 pandemic.

Lachat was the alternate for the Swiss National Men's Curling Team skipped by Peter de Cruz at the 2021 World Men's Curling Championship. At the Worlds, Team Switzerland finished the round robin with a 8–5 record which qualified them for the playoffs as the sixth seed. They then defeated the United States 7–6 in the qualification game before losing 11–3 to Sweden in the semifinal. They were able to defeat RCF (Russia) in the bronze medal game 6–5 to claim the bronze medal. Because the team qualified for the playoffs, they earned Switzerland a berth into the 2022 Winter Olympics.

Lachat was the alternate for the de Cruz rink once again for the 2021–22 season. At the start of the season, Team de Cruz won the 2021 Swiss Olympic Curling Trials, securing their spot as the Swiss representatives for the 2022 Winter Olympics. Next, the team represented Switzerland at the 2021 European Curling Championships where they finished the round robin with a 5–4 record, failing to advance to the playoffs. In February 2022, the team represented Switzerland at the 2022 Winter Olympics in Beijing, China. After a strong 3–1 start to the tournament, the team lost four straight games, ultimately finishing in seventh place with a disappointing 4–5 record. To end the season, Lachat competed with his own men's team of Noé Traub, Anthony Petoud and Theo Kurz at the 2022 Swiss Men's Championship. There, the team finished in fifth place with a 3–4 record.

Following the 2021–22 season, the top two Swiss rinks, Schwaller and de Cruz, announced that they would be disbanding. A new team was then created consisting of Lachat, Sven Michel, Yannick Schwaller and Benoît Schwarz for the 2022–23 season. Schwaller would skip the team but throw third rocks with Schwarz throwing fourth rocks, Michel playing second and Lachat at lead.

Personal life
Lachat is currently a law student.

Teams

References

External links

2000 births
Living people
Swiss male curlers
Sportspeople from Lausanne
Curlers at the 2022 Winter Olympics
Olympic curlers of Switzerland
21st-century Swiss people